Holy Expedition is the second live album by Japanese heavy metal band Bow Wow.

Track listing 
Side one
 "Getting Back on the Road" - 5:05
 "You're Mine" - 3:37
 "Touch Me, I'm on Fire" - 4:57
 "Can't Get Back to You" - 9:18

Side two
 "Don't Cry Baby" - 4:00
 "20th Century Child" - 4:45
 "Devil Woman" - 3:33
 "Theme of Bow Wow" - 7:00

Personnel
Kyoji Yamamoto - guitars, vocals
Mitsuhiro Saito - guitars, vocals
Kenji Sano - bass guitars, backing vocals, crazy voice
Toshihiro Niimi - drums, backing vocals

References

Vow Wow albums
1983 live albums
Roadrunner Records live albums
Live albums recorded at The Marquee Club